Le Fil is the second album by French singer–songwriter Camille. First released in 2005, the album was reissued with four bonus tracks in 2006 in the United States, the UK and Australia. The title translates as "The Thread".

The album features a low-level drone (a B tone) in the background of every song, which Camille has described as "[her] note". Camille has stated that many people returned the record, thinking this sound was a fault in the recording.

On the original release, the final track "Quand je marche" has a runtime close to 39 minutes. The actual song is only four minutes in duration, but the tone extends for over 30 minutes after it has ended. The final 30 seconds contain Camille speaking in French.  The extended ending was cut from reissues featuring bonus tracks.

It has been most frequently compared to Björk's Medúlla, for Camille's use of her voice as an instrument in innovative ways.

The track "Ta Douleur" placed 26 in the Triple J Hottest 100 for 2006.

In 2008, the eighth track on Le Fil, "Senza", was used by Ford in televised adverts for their Kuga SUV. The advert premiered at half time of the 2008 UEFA Champions League Final, opening up a new Pan-European audience to Camille's work. It has continued to air on networks across Europe throughout Euro 2008.

In 2010, the track "Ta douleur" was featured in the Saturday Night Live sketch "Les Jeunes de Paris".

Track listing
 "La jeune fille aux cheveux blancs"
 "Ta douleur"
 "Assise"
 "Janine I"
 "Vous"
 "Baby Carni Bird"
 "Pour que l'amour me quitte"
 "Senza"
 "Janine II"
 "Vertige"
 "Au port"
 "Janine III"
 "Pâle septembre"
 "Rue de Ménilmontant"
 "Quand je marche"

Reissue bonus tracks:
 "J'ai tort"
 "Jolie bruine"
 "Lumière"
 "Femme libérée"

Charts

Awards
Prix Constantin, 2005
Victoires de la Musique, 2006

References

Camille (singer) albums
2005 albums
Virgin Records albums
Experimental pop albums
A cappella albums